Ponsan-Soubiran is a commune in the Gers department in southwestern France.

Geography

Localisation

Hydrography 
The Petite Baïse flows north through the middle of the commune; then forms part of the commune's northern border.

Population

See also
Communes of the Gers department

References

Communes of Gers